]]
| genre      = Jazz
| length     = 71:50
| label      = Clean Feed
| producer   = Kris Davis, Ingrid Laubrock, Tyshawn Sorey
| chronology = Kris Davis
| prev_title = Aeriol Piano
| prev_year  = 2011
| next_title = Capricorn Climber
| next_year  = 2013
| misc       = 
}}

Union is the second album by Paradoxical Frog, a collective trio consisting of pianist Kris Davis, saxophonist Ingrid Laubrock and drummer Tyshawn Sorey. It was recorded in 2011 and released on the Portuguese Clean Feed label.

Reception

The Down Beat review by Bill Meyer says that, "This music is so concerned with essence that it sometimes errs on the side of severity; one wishes for just a bit more payoff after so much restraint."

In a double review for JazzTimes Lloyd Sachs states, "That Union is [fun] speaks to how much Davis, Laubrock and Sorey enjoy not only their group concept, but playing in each other's company."

Track listing
 "An Intermittent Procession" (Sorey) – 2:19
 "First Strike" (Laubrock) – 5:52 
 "Fear the Fairy Dust" (Davis) – 11:03
 "Second Strike" (Laubrock) – 7:07
 "Figment 2012" (Sorey) – 9:03
 "Union" (Davis) – 10:22
 "Masterisk" (Laubrock) – 12:17
 "Repose" (Sorey) – 12:15
 "Third Strike, You're Out" (Laubrock) – 1:32

Personnel
Kris Davis – piano
Ingrid Laubrock – tenor sax, soprano sax
Tyshawn Sorey – drums, melodica, trombone

References

2012 albums
Kris Davis albums
Ingrid Laubrock albums
Clean Feed Records albums